David DeCoteau (born January 5, 1962) is an American-Canadian film director and producer.

Biography

Early life
David DeCoteau was born on January 5, 1962, in Portland, Oregon.

Career
He has worked professionally in the movie business since he was 18. He got his start through Roger Corman, who hired him in 1980 as a production assistant at New World Pictures. In 1986, DeCoteau directed and produced his first feature film for Charles Band. He is the founder of Rapid Heart Pictures, where his films include A Talking Cat!?! and the 1313 series. He has said of his working methods, "I always wanted to make what I could sell. So I just promised myself that I would not be set in my ways. If somebody said, ‘Look, we need a horror film, we need a creature feature, we need a Western, we need a period costume drama,’ I was able to put it together pretty quickly."

DeCoteau has produced and directed more than ninety motion pictures over the past twenty-five years. He resides in British Columbia and Los Angeles. He is openly gay.

Filmography

References

External links

American film directors
Artists from Portland, Oregon
Horror film directors
1962 births
Living people
American people of French-Canadian descent
American gay writers
Filmmakers from Portland, Oregon
LGBT film directors